Upbit is a South Korean cryptocurrency exchange founded in 2017. It is operated by Dunamu, which is one of the highest-valued startups in South Korea.

History
Upbit launched in South Korea on October 24, 2017 with the help of their partnership with American cryptocurrency exchange Bittrex.

Sirgoo Lee was named CEO of Dunamu, Upbit’s parent company, on December 21, 2017, with Dunamu founder and CEO Chi-hyung Song assuming the role of Chairman. Lee previously served as Co-CEO of Kakao Corp. and JOINS, Inc.

Approximately two months after its launch, Upbit became the top global cryptocurrency exchange in terms of 24-hour trading volume.

On May 10, 2018 its main office was raided as part of a fraud probe.

The exchange began expanding into Southeast Asia in late 2018, first by launching in Singapore on October 30, and then beginning services in Indonesia starting January 2019, and Thailand starting January 2021.

On December 21, 2018 three Upbit officials were indicted for allegedly making fake orders. The exchange has denied the allegations.

In December 2018, Upbit became the first cryptocurrency exchange in the world to receive certifications from the Korea Internet and Security Agency for Information Security Management System (ISMS) and the International Organization for Standardization (ISO) for information security (ISO 27001), cloud security (ISO 27017) and cloud privacy (ISO 27018).

On November 27, 2019 Upbit lost about $48.5 million USD worth of Ethereum from a hack.

In September 2021, South Korea started to regulate virtual asset service providers.

References

External links
 

Companies based in Seoul
Cryptocurrencies